The Special Task Unit is a special operations unit of the Coast Guard Administration of Taiwan.

Overview

The Special Task Unit is an elite special forces, maritime rescue, and counterterrorism unit of the CGA. In 2010 the unit had 52 members distributed across five bases all of whom where career security forces professionals.

History
Development of the Special Task Unit began in 2000 and the unit was officially stood up in 2005 to address concerns about a rise in international terrorism.

During the 36th annual Han Kuang exercises in 2020 they participated alongside special operations units from other branches in anti-decapitation drills.

Training

Certifications in lifeguarding, swim instructing, and SCUBA diving are required before even qualifying as a candidate. Candidates must undergo three months training with the Marine Corps’ Amphibious Reconnaissance and Patrol Unit followed by two months training with the Military Police's Special Service Unit.

Training and physical fitness standards are extreme with a member's daily regimen including 100 pushups in under one minute. All members are proficient in at least two martial arts.

See also
 Thunder Squad
 List of military special forces units

References

Coast Guard Administration (Taiwan)
Non-military counterterrorist organizations
Special forces units of the Republic of China